Charleston station is an Amtrak station in Charleston, West Virginia, United States, that is listed on the National Register of Historic Places and is served by the Cardinal. The Cardinal operates as Train 50 Eastbound towards Washington D.C. and New York City departing Chicago on Saturdays, Tuesdays, and Thursdays. The train operates as Train 51 Westbound towards Chicago departing New York on Wednesdays, Fridays, and Sundays. Trains only operate to the station on Wednesdays, Fridays, and Sundays.

Description
The station was originally owned by the Chesapeake & Ohio Railway. In September 2010, the station was purchased by General Corporation, a commercial real estate company based in Charleston. The station is located on the south bank of the Kanawha River, opposite downtown Charleston which lies on the north bank. Much of the station's outdoor space is covered by the South Side Bridge which allows both vehicular and pedestrian traffic to access the downtown areas. A fine dining establishment, Laury's Restaurant, occupies much of the station's interior.

It was listed on the National Register of Historic Places in 1984 as the Chesapeake and Ohio Depot and part of the South Hills Multiple Resource Area.  It is a two-story, brick and stone structure in the Neo-Classical Revival style. The facade features a shallow pavilion of paired Roman Doric columns facing the Kanawha River.  It also has a low hipped, tile-covered roof with bracketed deep eaves.

Budget cuts in 2018 eliminated staffing of the station by an Amtrak station agent. Staffing of the station was reinstated in October 2020.  Tickets to and from Charleston must be purchased in advance or from the ticket agent, as there are no Quik-Trak kiosks available. The station also provides checked baggage service.

See also

 List of Amtrak stations
 National Register of Historic Places listings in Kanawha County, West Virginia

References

External links

 Charleston Amtrak Station (USA Rail Guide -- Train Web)
 National Register of Historic Places Inventory Nomination Form
 General Corporation
 Laury's Restaurant

Amtrak stations in West Virginia
Beaux-Arts architecture in West Virginia
Railway stations in the United States opened in 1905
Buildings and structures in Charleston, West Virginia
Neoclassical architecture in West Virginia
Railway stations on the National Register of Historic Places in West Virginia
Former Chesapeake and Ohio Railway stations
Transportation in Kanawha County, West Virginia